Jǐn (廑) was the 13th king of the semi-legendary Xia Dynasty of China. His other name is Yinjia (胤甲).

Reign 
Jin probably ruled for about 21 years. His father was King Jiong of Xia and his name means "shack".

According to the Bamboo Annals, Jin moved the capital to 'Western He' (西河). In the fourth year of Jin’s reign, he missed his former hometown and made the music of West Sound.

In the eighth year of his reign, it is recorded in the Bamboo Annals that ten suns rose in the sky causing a very serious drought.

One of his vassals, Ji Fan (己樊), was the leader of Kunwu (昆吾) clan. Originally he was assigned to the land of Wei, but he moved his capital from Wei to Xu.

Sources 

Xia dynasty kings